Angonyx boisduvali is a moth of the  family Sphingidae. It is found in the Bismarck Archipelago, Solomon Islands and Papua New Guinea.

The forewing upperside is similar to Angonyx papuana, but the pale grey median band posterior to the discal spot is broader, paler and gradually fading into the ground colour, lacking any dark scaling in this area.

References

Angonyx
Moths described in 1894
Moths of Oceania
Moths of New Guinea